Le Grand, often written incorrectly as LeGrand (no space), is a city in Marshall and Tama counties in the U.S. state of Iowa. The population was 905 at the time of the 2020 census.

History
Le Grand was laid out in 1852, and it was incorporated in 1891. The city was named for Le Grande Byington, the original owner of the town site.

Geography
Le Grand's longitude and latitude coordinates in decimal form are 42.006211, -92.776497.

Demographics

2010 census
As of the census of 2010, there were 938 people, 382 households, and 276 families living in the city. The racial makeup of the city was 97.1% White, 0.1% African American, 0.4% Native American, 0.1% Asian, 0.1% Pacific Islander, 1.6% from other races, and 0.5% from two or more races. Hispanic or Latino of any race were 3.5% of the population.

There were 382 households, of which 32.2% had children under the age of 18 living with them, 55.8% were married couples living together, 11.3% had a female householder with no husband present, 5.2% had a male householder with no wife present, and 27.7% were non-families. 23.6% of all households were made up of individuals, and 8.1% had someone living alone who was 65 years of age or older. The average household size was 2.46 and the average family size was 2.87.

The median age in the city was 41.9 years. 25.3% of residents were under the age of 18; 7.3% were between the ages of 18 and 24; 22.2% were from 25 to 44; 29.1% were from 45 to 64; and 16% were 65 years of age or older. The gender makeup of the city was 48.8% male and 51.2% female.

2000 census
As of the census of 2000, there were 883 people, 339 households, and 261 families living in the city. The racial makeup of the city was 97.96% White, 0.34% African American, 0.45% Native American, 0.34% Asian, 0.23% from other races, and 0.68% from two or more races. Hispanic or Latino of any race were 1.81% of the population.

There were 339 households, out of which 36.3% had children under the age of 18 living with them, 64.9% were married couples living together, 10.3% had a female householder with no husband present, and 23.0% were non-families. 20.6% of all households were made up of individuals, and 8.8% had someone living alone who was 65 years of age or older. The average household size was 2.60 and the average family size was 3.00.

27.4% are under the age of 18, 7.2% from 18 to 24, 26.2% from 25 to 44, 25.4% from 45 to 64, and 13.8% who were 65 years of age or older. The median age was 36 years. For every 100 females, there were 95.4 males. For every 100 females age 18 and over, there were 94.2 males.

The median income for a household in the city was $39,333, and the median income for a family was $42,153. Males had a median income of $33,333 versus $23,036 for females. The per capita income for the city was $16,470. About 3.3% of families and 4.5% of the population were below the poverty line, including 5.3% of those under age 18 and 5.0% of those age 65 or over.

Education
East Marshall Community School District serves the community. The district was established on July 1, 1992 by the merger of the LDF and SEMCO school districts.

Notable person

Jack Coombs, nicknamed "Colby Jack" after his alma mater was an American professional baseball player. Leading the league in wins 1910 and 1911. The 3x World Champion is in the Philadelphia Baseball Wall of Fame

See also

Le Grand Bridge (1896)
Le Grand Bridge (1914)

References

External links

Le Grand official website
City-Data Comprehensive Statistical Data and more about Le Grand

Cities in Iowa
Cities in Marshall County, Iowa
Cities in Tama County, Iowa